Abubakar Tatari Ali Polytechnic, popularly known as ATAP, is a state-owned tertiary institution in Bauchi State, Nigeria. It was established by Edict No. 1 of 1988. The institution offers National Diploma and Higher National Diploma courses at undergraduate levels.

There are seven unit schools in two campuses of the polytechnic.

References 

Education in Bauchi State
1988 establishments in Nigeria
Polytechnics in Nigeria
Educational institutions established in 1988
Public universities in Nigeria